is a railway station on the Takayama Main Line in the town of Sakahogi, Kamo District,  Gifu Prefecture, Japan, operated by Central Japan Railway Company (JR Central).

Lines

Station layout
Sakahogi Station has two opposed ground-level side platforms connected by a footbridge. The station is unattended.

Platforms

Adjacent stations

History
Sakahogi Station opened on November 12, 1921. The station was absorbed into the JR Central network upon the privatization of Japanese National Railways (JNR) on April 1, 1987.

Passenger statistics
In fiscal 2016, the station was used by an average of 411 passengers daily (boarding passengers only).

Surrounding area
Sakahogi Town Hall

See also
 List of Railway Stations in Japan

References

Railway stations in Gifu Prefecture
Takayama Main Line
Railway stations in Japan opened in 1921
Stations of Central Japan Railway Company
Sakahogi, Gifu